Bahlul or Pahlul is a village near the city of Stepanakert, de facto part of the breakaway Republic of Artsakh, de jure in Azerbaijan.

History 
In June 1919, the village and the neighboring villages of Ghaibalishen (Khaibalikend), Jamilli, and Karkijahan were looted and destroyed in the Khaibalikend massacre with 600-700 ethnic Armenians being killed by armed Kurdish irregulars and Azerbaijani soldiers.

References

External links 
 

Stepanakert